Liepājas Rokāde ("Liepāja Castling") is international "open" chess championship, annually held in Liepāja, Latvia in August. The first Liepājas rokāde was held in 1994, the last in 2018.

List of winners 
{| class="sortable wikitable"
! Year !! Open Tournament !! Super Tournament !! Blitz tournament !! Team Tournament
|-
| 1994
|  
|
|
|
|-
| 1995
|  
|
|
|
|-
| 1996
|  
|
|
|
|-
| 1997
|  
|
|
|
|-
| 1998
|  
|
|  
|
|-
| 1999
|  
|
|
|
|-
| 2000
|  
|   
|
|
|-
| 2001
|  
|  
|  
|
|-
| 2002
|  
|  
|  
|
|-
| 2003
|  
|  
|  
|
|-
| 2004
|  
|  
|
|
|-
| 2005
|  
|  
|  
| Švyturys
|-
| 2006
|  
|  
|  
| Švyturys
|-
| 2007
|  
|  
|  
| Joker
|-
| 2008
|   (Open A)  (Open B)  (Open C)
|  
|  
| Joker
|-
| 2009
|  
|
|  
| Joker
|-
| 2010
|  
|
|  
| Joker
|-
| 2011
|  
|
|  
| Terrabalt
|-
| 2012
|  
|
|  
| Terrabalt
|-
| 2013
|  
|  
|  
| MRU–Gintars
|-
| 2014
|  
| 
|  
| Terrabalt
|-
| 2015
|  
|  
|  
| Terrabalt
|-
| 2016
|  
|  
|  
| Terrabalt
|-
| 2017
|  
|  
|  
| Terrabalt
|-
| 2018
|  
|  
|  
| Terrabalt
|}

Super Tournament is not played in 2009-2012 and 2014.

Liepājas Rokāde 2009 
The Liepājas rokāde 2009 was opened on August 6, 2009. The tournament taking place in Liepāja Biedrības nams. The ceremony started from the speech of tournament director Āris Ozoliņš and Vita Hartmane, which read a letter of the Liepāja mayor Uldis Sesks to participants of the tournament. In 2009 there were 147 players from Latvia, Lithuania, Sweden, Portugal and Czech Republic, 7% of whom were women. The open tournament was held on 79 chess tables. The championship utilizes FIDE rules and uses Swiss pairing system in 13 rounds. The tournaments judged three referee — Dashkevics, Borisovs and A. Cimiņš. Overall prize fund — 2410 LVL and cups for the first 3 places. The competition traditionally has a large number of sponsors, including Liepājas Metalurgs and Liepāja City Council, additionally there was participation fee about 10 EUR for the players.
Tournament results:
  Arturs Neikšāns — 1st place
  Igors Rausis — 2nd place
  Guntars Antoms — 3rd place

References

External links
  Liepajas Rokade Chess Festival 2005
  XVII International Chess Festival Open tournament
  XVII International Chess Festival Blitz tournament
  XVIII International Chess Festival Open tournament
  XIX International Chess Festival Open tournament
  XX International Chess Festival Open tournament
  XX International Chess Festival Blitz tournament
  XX International Chess Festival Super tournament
  XX International Chess Festival Team tournament
  XXI International Chess Festival Open tournament
  XXI International Chess Festival Blitz tournament
  XXI International Chess Festival Team tournament
  XXII International Chess Festival Open tournament
  XXII International Chess Festival Blitz tournament
  XXII International Chess Festival Super tournament
  XXII International Chess Festival Team tournament
  XXIII International Chess Festival Open tournament
  XXIII International Chess Festival Blitz tournament
  XXIII International Chess Festival Super tournament
  XXIII International Chess Festival Team tournament
  XXIV International Chess Festival Open tournament
  XXIV International Chess Festival Blitz tournament
  XXIV International Chess Festival Super tournament
  XXIV International Chess Festival Team tournament
  XXV International Chess Festival Open tournament
  XXV International Chess Festival Blitz tournament
  XXV International Chess Festival Super tournament
  XXV International Chess Festival Team tournament

Sport in Liepāja
Chess competitions
Chess in Latvia